Rudolf "Rudi" Hoffmann (11 February 1935 – 16 October 2020) was a German footballer. He played for Viktoria Aschaffenburg, VfB Stuttgart and FK Pirmasens.

International career
He played one match for the Germany national football team, on 28 May 1955 against the Republic of Ireland. He later participated in the 1956 Olympics. He was part of the German 22-player squad for the 1958 FIFA World Cup, but was on reserve in Germany and did not actually travel to the tournament in Sweden (along with Wolfgang Peters, Hermann Nuber and Günter Sawitzki).

References

External links
 
 

1935 births
2020 deaths
German footballers
Germany international footballers
VfB Stuttgart players
Footballers at the 1956 Summer Olympics
Olympic footballers of the United Team of Germany
1958 FIFA World Cup players
Viktoria Aschaffenburg players
Association football defenders
FK Pirmasens players